Qayrun is a Syrian village located in the Masyaf Subdistrict in Masyaf District, located west of Hama. According to the Syria Central Bureau of Statistics (CBS), Qayrun had a population of 1,084 in the 2004 census. Its inhabitants are predominantly Alawites.

The writer Mamdouh Adwan was one of the notable people born in Qayrun.

References

Bibliography

Populated places in Masyaf District
Alawite communities in Syria